Mount Hope is an ethnically diverse, hilly urban neighborhood of the City of San Diego, California. The neighborhood contains a mixture of residential, industrial, commercial, and cemetery uses.

Background
Located within the community is an unincorporated area encompassing the Greenwood Cemetery, a private cemetery. Within Greenwood Cemetery, is the Cathedral Mausoleum which was built in 1919, which grew to the largest single building mausoleum in the world.

Geography
State Route 94 (Martin Luther King Jr. Freeway) is the northern boundary, Interstate 805 is the eastern boundary, Interstate 15 is the western boundary, and Imperial Avenue is the southern boundary. The major San Diego thoroughfare Market Street runs through this community.

Demographics
Mount Hope is a diverse neighborhood and home to one of the highest concentrations of Latinos in the City. Current demographics for the neighborhood are as follows: people of Hispanic/Latino heritage make up 77.0%, followed by African-Americans at 10.0%, Asian at 7.2%, non-Hispanic Whites 4.8%,  and Mixed Race at 1.0%.

Government
Mount Hope is located within the 9th City Council District, currently represented by Sean Elo-Rivera. It is part of the Southeastern San Diego Planning Area.

Education
Mount Hope is served primarily by the San Diego Unified School District.

References

Neighborhoods in San Diego